Phelotis is a monotypic moth genus in the family Geometridae erected by Edward Guest in 1887. Its single species, Phelotis cognata, the long-fringed bark moth, first described by Francis Walker in 1860, is found in Australia.

The wingspan is about 26 mm for males and about 30 mm for females.

The larvae feed on Exocarpus species, but is thought that it has other food plants too.

References

Boarmiini
Moths of Australia
Monotypic moth genera